Sickness Insurance (Sea) Convention, 1936 is  an International Labour Organization Convention.

It was established in 1936, with the preamble stating:
Having decided upon the adoption of certain proposals with regard to sickness insurance for seamen,...

Ratifications
As of 2013, the treaty has been ratified by 20 states. 16 of the ratifying states have subsequently denounced the convention.

External links 
Text.
Ratifications.

Employee benefits
International Labour Organization conventions
Treaties concluded in 1936
Treaties entered into force in 1949
Treaties of Algeria
Treaties of Belgium
Treaties of Bosnia and Herzegovina
Treaties of Djibouti
Treaties of Egypt
Treaties of West Germany
Treaties of Mexico
Treaties of Montenegro
Treaties of Panama
Treaties of Peru
Treaties of Slovenia
Treaties of North Macedonia
Treaties of the United Kingdom
Treaties of Yugoslavia
Admiralty law treaties
Occupational safety and health treaties
1936 in labor relations